This is a list of Mexican states by their respective homicide data.

Methodology 

The National Institute of Statistic and Geography released information of homicides for the 32 federal states of Mexico. In the year 2011 there were 27,199 homicides in Mexico. The state of Chihuahua ranked number one with the most homicides in the country, the least was Baja California Sur. For Mexico there were 24 homicides for every 100,000 inhabitants.

2011 INEGI records

Homicide rates by year

Intentional homicide rate (per 100,000)

See also
 Crime in Mexico
 List of cities by murder rate
 Homicide in world cities
 List of Brazilian states by murder rate
 List of U.S. states by homicide rate
 List of federal subjects of Russia by murder rate
 List of countries by intentional homicide rate

Notes

References

Population
Murder in Mexico
Mexican states
Mexico, homicides